Elizabeth O'Conner (1913 – 6 May 2000), born under the name Barbara Willard Lowe, was an Australian novelist.  Elizabeth O'Conner was born in Dunedoo in New South Wales. After a childhood spent in Katoomba in the Blue Mountains region of New South Wales, she studied art in Adelaide and Sydney, before teaching at a Brisbane girls' boarding school.

She married Philip Birmingham McNamara, manager of a cattle station in March 1942 and moved to Queensland's Gulf Country, where she had four children.  She died in Atherton, Queensland in 2000.

Bibliography

Novels
 The Irishman (1960)
 Find a Woman (1963)
 The Chinee Bird (1966)
 The Winds of Fate (1977) - published under the pseudonym Anne Willard
 Spirit Man (1980)
 Darling Caroline (1980) - published under the pseudonym Anne Willard

Autobiography
 Steak for Breakfast (1958)
 A Second Helping (1969)

Awards
 1960 — winner Miles Franklin Award for The Irishman

References

1913 births
2000 deaths
Miles Franklin Award winners
People from New South Wales
20th-century Australian novelists
20th-century Australian women writers
Australian women novelists